Finger Prints is a 1931 American Pre-Code Universal movie serial. It is considered to be a lost film. (This was the last Universal serial with only ten chapters.)

Plot
United States Secret Service agent Gary Gordon (Kenneth Harlan) is working on shutting down the "River Gang", a smuggling ring. His girlfriend Lola's father, John Mackey, is secretly a member of the gang. Soon after, events are complicated when the villainous Kent Martin (Gayne Whitman) attempts to blackmail Mackey for his daughter's hand in marriage. At one point, Lola's father is falsely accused of murder, and agent Gordon tries valiantly to prove his innocence.

Cast
Kenneth Harlan as Gary Gordon, Secret Service agent
Edna Murphy as Lola Mackey, Gordon's girlfriend
Gayne Whitman as Kent Martin, Blackmailer
Gertrude Astor as Jane Madden, Martin's girlfriend
William Worthington as John Mackey, Lola's father 
William L. Thorne as Joe Burke, Mackey's partner in the River Gang
Monte Montague as Officer Rooney

Chapter titles
 The Dance of Death
 A Fugitive of Fear
 Toll of the Sea
 The Sinister Shadow
 The Plunge of Peril
 The Finger of Fate
 The Depths of Doom
 The Thundering Terror
 Flames of Fury
 The Final Reckoning
Source:

This was the last Universal serial with only ten chapters.

See also
 List of film serials
 List of film serials by studio

References

External links

 

1931 films
1931 crime drama films
American black-and-white films
1930s English-language films
Universal Pictures film serials
Films directed by Ray Taylor
Lost American films
American crime drama films
1931 lost films
Films with screenplays by George H. Plympton
Films about the United States Secret Service
1930s American films